The 1985 William Jones Memorial Cup is the ninth edition of the William Jones Cup.

Fourteen teams participated in the preliminary round composing of four groups with the top two from each group advancing. The team from the Philippines defeated the United States in the final at overtime.

Participants
Top 8

 San Miguel (Philippines)

Other

 Kwanghwa

Preliminary round

Group A

Group B

Group C

Group D

Final round
Known matches

Third place

Final

Awards

Final standings
  San Miguel 7–0
  6–1
 
4th 
5th 
6th 
7th 
8th 
Others: Preliminary Round (9th–14th)

Notes

References

1985
1985 in Taiwanese sport
1985–86 in European basketball
1985–86 in North American basketball
1985–86 in South American basketball
1985 in Asian basketball